Tapejaroidea (or tapejaroids) is a group of pterosaurs belonging to the clade Ornithocheiroidea. Tapejaroids lived from the Early to Late Cretaceous periods, with one possible member, Tendaguripterus, extending the fossil range to the Late Jurassic period. Tapejaroidea contains two groups, the Dsungaripteridae and the Azhdarchoidea, which in turn includes the azhdarchids, the group that contains some of the largest flying animals. The group was named by Brazilian paleontologist Alexander Wilhelm Armin Kellner in 1996.

Classification
Tapejaroidea was named by paleontologist Alexander Kellner from Brazil in 1996, and in 2003 it was given a phylogenetic definition by Kellner himself as the most recent common ancestor of Dsungaripterus, Tapejara and Quetzalcoatlus, and all their descendants. Tapejaroidea, in Kellner's 2003 study, was recovered as the sister taxon of the Pteranodontoidea, both within the group Ornithocheiroidea, and consisting of the groups Dsungaripteridae and Azhdarchoidea. However, in a phylogenetic analysis made by Jaime Headden and Hebert Bruno Nascimento Campos in 2014, Tapejaroidea was recovered within the Azhdarchoidea, as a clade comprising the families Tapejaridae and Thalassodromidae. The cladogram of their analysis is shown below:

More recently, the original definition of Tapejaroidea has been used in a number of phylogenetic analyses conducted in 2019 and 2020, meaning that Tapejaroidea and Pteranodontoidea were once again recovered as the sister taxa and within the larger Ornithocheiroidea. The cladogram below represents the phylogenetic analysis conducted by Kellner and colleagues in 2019, where they recovered Tapejaroidea as the more inclusive group containing both the Dsungaripteridae and the Azhdarchoidea.

In 2021, Pêgas et al. named and officially registered two new clades: Azhdarchomorpha, the most inclusive clade containing Azhdarcho but not Tapejara or Thalassodromeus, and Alanqidae, containing Alanqa but not Chaoyangopterus or Azhdarcho. Their phylogeny is shown below:

References

Ornithocheiroids
Maastrichtian extinctions